Vitis blancoi is a species of liana in the grape family which bears black berries, and is native to western Mexico.

References

blancoi
Plants described in 1906
Flora of Mexico